Barbosella cogniauxiana is a species of orchid.

It is native to the Atlantic Forest in southern Brazil (States of São Paulo, Santa Catarina, Rio de Janeiro, Paraná);  and in eastern Argentina in Misiones state.

See also
 List of plants of Atlantic Forest vegetation of Brazil

References

External links

cogniauxiana
Orchids of Brazil
Orchids of Argentina
Flora of the Atlantic Forest
Plants described in 1908